Andrew Raikes Hargreaves (born 15 May 1955) is a former British Conservative Party politician.

Having unsuccessfully stood in 1983 for Blyth Valley (which was eventually won by the Conservatives in 2019), Hargreaves was elected Member of Parliament for Birmingham Hall Green in 1987.  He lost his seat in the Labour landslide at the 1997 general election on a 14% swing, to Stephen McCabe.

References

External links 
 

1955 births
Living people
Conservative Party (UK) MPs for English constituencies
UK MPs 1987–1992
UK MPs 1992–1997